Rebecca Wilson is an art curator and editor, who is currently chief curator and vice president of Art Advisory at Saatchi Art.

Biography
Wilson graduated in 1990 with BA from University of Cambridge and received her MA degree from University College London in 1991. She started her career in book and magazine publishing as publishing director of Weidenfeld & Nicolson publishing house and then deputy editor of Modern Painters and editor of ArtReview. She joined Saatchi Gallery in 2006 as director and in 2013 became chief curator and directory of art advisory of Saatchi Art. In 2007 Wilson created "New Sensations" prize – an award for art students for support emerging artists in the United Kingdom.

Personal life
Wilson is married to English writer Geoff Dyer.

Charles Saatchi lawsuit
In 2014 Charles Saatchi sued Wilson for alleged trading in his name after she moved from being director of Saatchi Gallery to her Saatchi Art position.

References

External links
Curator Profile of Rebecca Wilson
Rebecca Wilson on Bloomberg
Rebecca Wilson blog on Forbes

British art curators
British editors
British women editors
British women curators